Samantha Kerkman ( Starzyk; born March 6, 1974) is an American politician.  She is the county executive of Kenosha County, Wisconsin, serving since April 2022. She previously represented Kenosha County in the Wisconsin State Assembly from 2001 through 2022.

Early life and career 

Samantha Kerkman was born Samantha Starzyk in Burlington, Wisconsin.  She graduated from Wilmot Union High School and attended the University of Wisconsin–Whitewater, where she earned a bachelor's degree in political science in 1996.

Political career 
While in college, Kerkman began working as an intern and legislative assistant in the office of State Representative Cloyd A. Porter, and, after graduating, was named his chief of staff.  She also began volunteering with the Randall, Wisconsin, Fire Department Auxiliary.

When Porter announced in 2000 that he would not seek reelection to a 15th term, Kerkman chose to enter the race to replace him.  Porter quickly endorsed his former legislative aide, saying, "I think Samantha has made an excellent decision. I am confident that Samantha has the strength, energy, and the dedication to serve the people of the 66th to her full potential."  She prevailed in the Republican primary with 85% of the vote and went on to take 61% of the general election vote against Democrat Virgil Gentz.  Kerkman was subsequently reelected five times in the 66th assembly district, and, after redistricting in 2013, Kerkman has been serving in what is now the 61st assembly district. On April 5, 2022, Kerkman was elected Kenosha County Executive. She assumed office on April 18, 2022.

Personal life and family 
Samantha Starzyk took the last name Kerkman in 2001, when she married attorney Chad Kerkman.  They have two children and divorced in 2013.

References

External links 
 https://www.kenoshacounty.org/144/County-Executive
 https://www.votesamanthakerkman.com/
 https://www.linkedin.com/in/samantha-kerkman-5561656

University of Wisconsin ndash;Whitewater alumni
Republican Party members of the Wisconsin State Assembly
Women state legislators in Wisconsin
1974 births
Living people
21st-century American politicians
21st-century American women politicians
People from Burlington, Wisconsin
People from Randall, Wisconsin